Rasmus Österman is a professional floorball goalie who currently plays for NTK Nakkila in III-divisioona. Österman has also played in the Salibandyliiga (now F-liiga) (top tier Finnish floorball league) for FBT Karhut.

Career 
In the season 2018-19 Österman played for FBT Karhut in the Salibandyliiga (now F-liiga) he played 21 games.

In 2019 Österman went in his hometown floorball team NTK Nakkila.

Sources 

Finnish floorball players
1991 births
Living people
People from Nakkila
Sportspeople from Satakunta
21st-century Finnish people